Qelinjlu (also Romanized as Qelīnjlū; also known as Qelenjlū and Qelīchlū) is a village in Nazlu-e Shomali Rural District, Nazlu District, Urmia County, West Azerbaijan Province, Iran. At the 2006 census, its population was 97, in 30 families.

References 

Populated places in Urmia County